Bhirrana, also Bhirdana and Birhana, (Hindi: भिरड़ाना; IAST: Bhirḍāna) is an archaeological site, located in a small village in Fatehabad District, in the Indian state of Haryana. Bhirrana's earliest archaeological layers predates Indus Valley civilisation times, dating to the 8th-7th millennium BCE. The site is one of the many sites seen along the channels of  the seasonal Ghaggar river, thought by some to be the Rigvedic Saraswati river.

Location
The site is one of the many sites seen along the paleo-channels of channels of the seasonal Ghaggar River which flows in modern Haryana from Nahan to Sirsa.

Excavations
The Excavation Branch-I, Nagpur of the Archaeological Survey of India excavated this site for three field seasons during 2003–04, 2004–05 and 2005–06. Several publications have been written on it by Rao et al.

Dating
Rao, who excavated Bhirrana, claims to have found pre-Harappan Hakra Ware in its oldest layers, dated at the 8th-7th millennium BCE. He proposes older datings for Bhirrana compared to the conventional Harappan datings, yet sticks to the Harappan terminology. This proposal is supported by Sarkar et al.

Cultures
According to Rao, the excavation has revealed these cultural periods; Period IA: Hakra Wares Culture, Period IB: Early Harappan Culture, Period IIA: Early Mature Harappan and Period IIB: Mature Harappan Culture. According to the Archaeological Survey of India, the excavation has revealed the remains of the Harappan culture right from its nascent stage, i.e., Hakra Wares Culture (antedating the Known Early Harappan Culture in the subcontinent, also known as Kalibangan-I.) to a full-fledged Mature Harappan city.

Period IA: Hakra Wares Culture 
Prior to the excavation of Bhirrana, no Hakra Wares culture, predating the Early Harappan had been exposed in any Indian site. According to the ASI, for the first time, the remains of this culture have been exposed at Bhirrana. This culture is characterised by structures in the form of subterranean dwelling pits, cut into the natural soil. The walls and floor of these pits were plastered with the yellowish alluvium of the Saraswati valley. The artefacts of this period comprised a copper bangle, a copper arrowhead, bangles of terracotta, beads of carnelian, lapis lazuli and steatite, bone point, stone saddle and quern. The pottery repertoire is very rich and the diagnostic wares of this period included Mud Applique Wares, Incised (Deep and Light), Tan/Chocolate Slipped Wares, Brown-on-Buff Wares, Bichrome Wares (Paintings on the exterior with black and white pigments), Black-on-Red Ware and plain red wares.

Period IB: Early Harappan Culture 
The entire site was occupied during this period. The settlement was an open air one with no fortification. The houses were built of mud bricks of buff colour in the ratio of 3:2:1. The pottery of this period shows all the six fabrics of Kalibangan - I along with many of the Hakra Wares of the earlier period. The artifacts of this period include a seal of quarter-foil shape made of shell, arrowheads, bangles and rings of copper, beads of carnelian, jasper, lapis lazuli, steatite, shell and terracotta, pendents, bull figurines, rattles, wheels, gamesmen, and marbles of terracotta, bangles of terracotta and faience, bone objects, sling balls, marbles and pounders of sandstone.

Period IIA: Early Mature Harappan Culture 
This period is marked by transformation in the city lay-out. The entire settlement was encompassed within a fortification wall. The twin units of the town planning; Citadel and Lower Town came into vogue. The mud brick structures were aligned with a slight deviation from the true north. The streets, lanes and by-lanes were oriented in similar fashion. The pottery assemblage shows a mixed bag of Early Harappan and Mature Harappan forms. The artifacts of the period included beads of semi-precious stones (including two caches of beads kept in two miniature pots), bangles of copper, shell, terracotta and faience; fishhook, chisel, arrowhead of copper; terracotta animal figurines and a host of miscellaneous artifacts.

Period IIB: Mature Harappan Culture 
The last period of occupation at the site belongs to the Mature Harappan period with all the characteristic features of a well-developed Harappan city. The important artifacts of the period consisted of Seals of steatite, bangles of copper, terracotta, faience and shell, inscribed celts of copper, bone objects, terracotta spoked wheels, animal figurines of terracotta, beads of lapis lazuli, carnelian, agate, faience, steatite, terracotta and stone objects. A replica of the famous "Dancing Girl" from Mohenjodaro is found engraved on a potsherd in the form of a graffiti. The massive fortification wall of the town was made of mud bricks. The houses were made of mud bricks (sun-baked bricks). Wide linear roads can be seen separating the houses. A circular structure of baked earth is probably a "tandoor"- a community kitchen still seen in rural India. Presence of the baked bricks is seen used in the main drain provided on the width of the northern arm of the fortification wall to flush out the waste water from the houses.

Dancing girl graffiti

Pottery graffiti at Bhirrana show "mermaid" type deities and dancing girls; the latter have a posture similar to Mohenjo-daro's bronze "dancing girls" that the archaeologist L.S. Rao stated that "it appears that the craftsman of Bhirrana had first-hand knowledge of the former." These deities or dancing girls may represent apsaras, or water nymphs, associated with water rites once widespread in the Indus Valley civilisation.

Other findings
Other significant findings included terracotta wheels with painted spokes. People used to live in shallow mud plastered pit dwellings and pits were also used for industrial activity or sacrifices. Multi-roomed houses were exposed at this site, one house with ten rooms and another with three rooms. Another house had a kitchen, court yards, chullah [i.e., chulha, cooking stoves] in the kitchen; beside the chullah, charred grains were also found.

According to Rao, all phases of Indus Valley Civilisation are represented in this site.

See also

 Indus Valley civilisation related
 List of Indus Valley Civilisation sites
 Bhirrana, 4 phases of IVC with earliest dated to 8th-7th millennium BCE
 Kalibanga, an IVC town and fort with several phases starting from Early harappan phase
 Rakhigarhi, one of the largest IVC city with 4 phases of IVC with earliest dated to 8th-7th millennium BCE
 Kunal, cultural ancestor of Rehman Dheri
 List of inventions and discoveries of the Indus Valley civilisation
 Sanitation of the Indus Valley civilisation
 Periodisation of the Indus Valley civilisation
 Pottery in the Indian subcontinent
 Bara culture, subtype of Late-Harappan Phase
 Cemetery H culture (2000-1400 BC), early Indo-Aryan pottery at IVC sites later evolved into Painted Grey Ware culture of Vedic period
 Black and red ware, belonging to neolithic and Early-Harappan phases
 Sothi-Siswal culture, subtype of Early-Harappan Phase
 Rakhigarhi Indus Valley Civilisation Museum
 History of Haryana
 List of Monuments of National Importance in Haryana
 List of State Protected Monuments in Haryana

Notes

References

Sources

Printed sources

Web-sources

Further reading

The Tribune,   2 January 2004
Purātattva, The Bulletin of the Archaeological Society of India No. 34, 35 and 36;
Man and Environment xxxi

External links
Graffiti of dancing girl

Archaeological cultures in India
Indus Valley civilisation sites
Former populated places in India
Villages in Fatehabad district
Archaeological sites in Haryana
Pre-Indus Valley civilisation sites